Six-Guns is an open-world action-adventure video game developed by Gameloft. It was released in 2011 for iOS devices, on March 17, 2012, for Android devices, and on September 4, 2013, for Microsoft Windows and Windows Phone.

Gameplay 
Six-Guns is a wild-west styled open-world, action adventure third-person mobile game. The player may roam about on foot or by horse to complete missions as a man named Buck Crosshaw across two game maps, Arizona (with deserts and mesas) and Oregon (featuring forests and mountains). An in-game store and currency system allow for upgradable clothing items, weapons, and horses, with optional microtransactions available for additional or premium credits. As missions are completed, the player is rewarded with coins and experience points, unlocking access to higher tier items from the store. The main storyline and campaign follows Crosshaw's discoveries of the happenings and fate of his lost wife, while a multiplayer mode features online team deathmatches and capture-the-flag.

The Windows 8 version had support for touch controls, keyboard and mouse, and a gaming controller. The game could also cloud save to a linked account, such as Game Center on iOS or Xbox Live on Windows.

Plot

Buck Crosshaw, a lone and amnesiac outlaw, awakens in the Arizona desert and heads west in search for the nearest settlement. Nearing a ranch, he sees a woman and her ranch being attacked by bandit raiders. After fending them off, the lady offers Buck a horse for his troubles. As he rides away, the lady suddenly triggers Buck's memory of his wife mysteriously dying. Unsettled, Buck heads to town to drink and repress further memories of his wife.

As he enters town, the sheriff recognizes Buck as an outlaw and holds him at gunpoint, but a large group of raiders arrive and start to plunder the town.  Proving his honor, Buck helps the sheriff fight the bandits, who then turns a blind eye to let Buck escape. Buck slowly gains back more of his memory, and instead decides to visit her grave to pay his respects. At the graveyard, Buck witnesses a group of grave robbers digging out and stealing his wife's corpse, prompting him to further investigate into her death. He tracks the bandits down and discovers they are hired guns employed by a local barman. After a confrontation, the barman confesses and reveals a ruthless gang of criminals who forced him into their work after kidnapping his son. Buck makes a deal with the barman to go up against the gang in exchange for information on the whereabout of the gang's leaders. After tracking down and defeating the gang leaders, a mysterious monster hunter known as the Exorcist confronts Buck and reveals the true nature of the gang.

The Exorcist explains that the barman is actually the founder of the gang, and that he never had a son but was instead cut from the gang. The Exorcist further explains that this gang is a secretive cult bent on performing a powerful ritual to summon supernatural entities and the devil himself into the world. In addition, Buck's wife was a powerful witch in the cult, and it was Buck who shot her upon realizing her witchcraft intentions. The Exorcist reveals that the witch survived, and that he needs Buck's help in stopping her from conducting the ritual.

Discouraged, Buck resumes his drinking habits, becomes intoxicated, and is imprisoned for his rowdy behavior, but escapes shortly after. He overhears and follows the barman and his men to an abandoned mining town, renewed in his quest to stop the barman and the witch. Within the mine, Buck finds the barman with Buck's wife, where the barman reveals that he is infatuated with Buck's wife and intends to be in "unholy matrimony" with the witch, before he starts to cough blood and quickly dies from the witch's poison. The witch declares that Buck never really loved her, and that she had to use love potions to get Buck to love her, but this use of witchcraft only enticed her to the devil for empowering her. The witch then advances towards Buck to kill him but is suddenly shot by the Exorcist. Enraged, the witch turns and attacks the Exorcist, fatally wounding him. Buck fights the witch and is stabbed with a ritual knife before defeating her. Buck succumbs to the puncture wound from the knife and is abruptly teleported to a mystic, etheric dimension, standing before the devil incarnated as a shadowy form of Buck.

The devil unveils that it was he who temporally took over Buck's body so he could shoot his wife, using Buck's drunkenness' to cause him to forget the details surrounding his wife's death. After a fierce battle, Buck and the Exorcist's spirit finally defeat the devil, and Buck emerges from the mine before burying the Exorcist's body. Standing in front of the Exorcist's grave, Buck dedicates himself to ridding the land of the rest of the demonic entities in honor of the Exorcist.

Reception 
Six-Guns received mixed reviews, scoring a 59 on Metacritic. Many critics praised the graphics and audio of the game, but criticized the repetitive and simple gameplay.

Some also felt that the controls were poor on touchscreen devices.

References

2011 video games
Android (operating system) games
IOS games
Video games developed in Spain
Western (genre) video games
Video games about amnesia
Video games about demons
Video games about the paranormal
Video games set in Arizona
Video games set in Oregon
Windows games
Windows Phone games
Gameloft games
Multiplayer and single-player video games
Video games about cults